Frank Duveneck (né Decker; October 9, 1848 – January 3, 1919) was an American figure and portrait painter.

Early life
Duveneck was born in Covington, Kentucky, the son of German immigrant Bernhard Decker. Decker died in a cholera epidemic when Frank was only a year old, and his widow remarried Joseph "Squire" Duveneck. By the age of 15, Frank had begun the study of art under the tutelage of a local painter, Johann Schmitt, and had been apprenticed to a German firm of church decorators.

While having grown up in Covington, Duveneck was a part of the German community in Cincinnati, Ohio, just across the Ohio River. Due to his Catholic beliefs and German heritage, though, he was an outsider as far as the artistic community of Cincinnati was concerned.

Career
In 1869, he went abroad to study with Wilhelm von Diez and Wilhelm Leibl at the Royal Academy of Munich, where he learned a dark, realistic, and direct style of painting. He subsequently became one of the young American painters—others were William Merritt Chase, John Henry Twachtman, Willis Seaver Adams, and Walter Shirlaw—who in the 1870s overturned the traditions of the Hudson River School and started a new art movement characterized by a greater freedom of paint application.

Success

His work, at first ignored in Covington, attracted great attention when shown at the Boston Art Club in 1875, and pupils flocked to him in Germany and Italy, where he made long visits. Henry James called him "the unsuspected genius", and at the age of 27, he was a celebrated artist. In 1878, Duveneck opened a school in Munich, and in the village of Polling in Bavaria. His students, known as the "Duveneck Boys", included John Twachtman, Otto Henry Bacher, Julius Rolshoven, and John White Alexander.

Following the death of his wife in March 1888, he returned to America from Italy and gave some attention to sculpture, and modelled a fine monument to his wife, now in the Cimitero Evangelico agli Allori in Florence. Despite this activity, Elizabeth's death marked a slowing in his productivity; a wealthy man, he chose to lead a life of relative obscurity. He lived in Covington until his death in 1919 and taught at the Art Academy of Cincinnati, where some of his pupils of note were Cornelia Cassady Davis, Ida Holterhoff Holloway, John Christen Johansen, M. Jean McLane, Edward Charles Volkert, Russel Wright, Charles Mills, Frances Farrand Dodge, and Herman and Bessie Wessel.

Among his most famous paintings are Lady with Fan (1873) and The Whistling Boy (1872), both of which reveal Duveneck's debt to the dark palette and slashing brushwork of Frans Hals. His work can be seen at the Metropolitan Museum of Art in New York City, the National Gallery of Art in Washington, DC, the Museum of Fine Arts in Boston, the Cincinnati Art Museum, the Richmond Art Museum, the Hyde Collection in Glen's Falls, New York, the Kenton County Library in Covington, Kentucky, and the Cathedral Basilica of the Assumption, also in Covington and the Frances Lehman Loeb Art Center in Poughkeepsie, New York. A portrait, Young Man with Tousled Hair (The Street Urchin), now in the Smithsonian American Art Museum, was previously in the collection of Kurt Vonnegut. In 1905, he was elected into the National Academy of Design as an associate member, and became a full academician in 1906. He was awarded a special gold medal at the San Francisco Exposition in 1915, and the same year, he presented a large collection of his own works to the Cincinnati museum.

Personal life
On March 25, 1886, Duveneck married one of his students, who was much admired by Henry James, Boston-born Elizabeth Boott. The two had been engaged off and on since 1881. They lived in Villa Castellani in Florence (where she had been raised) for two years. Together, they were the parents of a son, Frank Boott Duveneck. She died in Paris of pneumonia, and Duveneck reportedly was devastated.
Later, Duveneck often spent summers in Gloucester, Massachusetts, visiting his son and painting .
 
After his death in Cincinnati, Ohio, on January 3, 1919, Duveneck was buried at the Mother of God Cemetery, in Covington. A life-sized bronze statue depicting Duveneck holding a plaque with his wife's picture on it stands in a small park at the intersection of Pike and Washington Streets in Covington.

Gallery

See also

 List of Orientalist artists
 List of artistic works with Orientalist influences
 Orientalism

References

Further reading
Poole, Emily. "The Etchings of Frank Duveneck", The Print Collector's Quarterly, October 1938, Vol. 25, No. 3, p. 313.
Poole, Emily. "Catalogue of the Etchings of Frank Duveneck", The Print Collector's Quarterly, December 1938, Vol. 5, No. 4, p. 447.

External links
 
 
 Works by Duveneck at the Cincinnati Art Museum.
 www.artistarchive.com Poole catalogue of 30 prints with a description of each and some images.

1848 births
1919 deaths
19th-century American painters
20th-century American painters
Academy of Fine Arts, Munich alumni
American people of German descent
American male painters
Artists from Cincinnati
Pennsylvania Academy of the Fine Arts alumni
Art Students League of New York faculty
Art Academy of Cincinnati faculty
Munich School
Orientalist painters
People from Covington, Kentucky
Painters from Kentucky
19th-century American male artists
20th-century American male artists
Members of the American Academy of Arts and Letters